Renato Carlos Martins Júnior (born 14 May 1987), commonly known as Renatinho, is a Brazilian footballer who plays as a right winger.

He was linked with Sporting during 2008 summer transfer window. However, he joined Japanese club Kawasaki Frontale in August 2008.

Club statistics

Honours
São Paulo State League Sub-17: 2004
São Paulo State League: 2006 & 2007

References

External links

 CBF

1987 births
Living people
People from São Vicente, São Paulo
Brazilian footballers
Brazilian expatriate footballers
Campeonato Brasileiro Série A players
Santos FC players
Kawasaki Frontale players
Portimonense S.C. players
Zhejiang Professional F.C. players
Vonds Ichihara players
Chinese Super League players
J1 League players
Primeira Liga players
Chiangrai United F.C. players
KF Skënderbeu Korçë players
Kategoria Superiore players
Thai League 1 players
Associação Atlética Anapolina players
Campeonato Brasileiro Série D players
Brasiliense Futebol Clube players
Clube Atlético Linense players
Expatriate footballers in Japan
Brazilian expatriate sportspeople in Japan
Expatriate footballers in Portugal
Brazilian expatriate sportspeople in Portugal
Expatriate footballers in China
Brazilian expatriate sportspeople in China
Brazilian expatriate sportspeople in Thailand
Expatriate footballers in Thailand
Brazilian expatriate sportspeople in Albania
Expatriate footballers in Albania
Association football wingers
Association football forwards
Footballers from São Paulo (state)